Arystan Oil Field is an oil field located in Mangystau Province, Kazakhstan. It was discovered in 2008 and developed by Korea National Oil Corporation. The oil field is operated and owned by Korea National Oil Corporation.

References 

Oil fields of Kazakhstan